Reinsalu is an Estonian surname. Notable people with the surname include:

Elisabet Reinsalu (until 2012, Elisabet Tamm; born 1976), Estonian actress
Urmas Reinsalu (born 1975), Estonian politician

Estonian-language surnames